Laurence Everett Pope II (September 24, 1945 – October 31, 2020) was an American diplomat. He was the United States Ambassador to Chad from 1993 to 1996 and former US Chargé d’Affaires to Libya. Pope held a number of senior posts in the Department of State. He was the Director for Northern Gulf Affairs (1987–1990), Associate Director for Counter-Terrorism (1991–1993), U.S. Ambassador to Chad (1993–1996), and Political Advisor to General Anthony Zinni USMC, Commander-in-Chief of United States Central Command (1997–2000).

In 2000, President Bill Clinton nominated him as Ambassador to Kuwait but his appointment was not confirmed by the Senate.

Ambassador Pope retired from the U.S. Foreign Service on October 2, 2000, after 31 years of service. He continued to consult with various institutions and was a respected arabist. A graduate of Bowdoin College, Pope also had advanced studies at Princeton University and is a graduate of the U.S. Department of State Senior Seminar, a Senior Fellow at the Armed Forces Staff College. He spoked Arabic and French, and resided in Portland, Maine.

Laurence Pope was the eldest son of Medal of Honor recipient Major Everett P. Pope, who was married to Eleanor Pope. He had a brother named Ralph H. Pope.

On Thursday, October 11, 2012, the U.S. Department of State announced that Ambassador Pope had arrived in Tripoli as the U.S Chargé d’Affaires in Libya.<ref>[http://www.kuna.net.kw/ArticleDetails.aspx?id=2267821&language=en  New US Charge dAffairs starts his work in Libya], Kuwait News Agency.</ref>

On January 4, 2013, the United States embassy in Tripoli announced that William Roebuck arrived in Tripoli as the new Chargé d’Affaires in Libya replacing Pope.

Pope died at his home in Portland, Maine, from pancreatic cancer.

Publications
 Letters (1694–1700) of François de Callières to the Marquis d’Huxelles (Edwin Mellen Press, 2004)
 "Advice and Contempt", Foreign Service Journal'', April 2001, Vo. 78, No. 4.

References

External links
 United States Department of State: Chiefs of Mission for Chad
 United States Department of State: Chad
 United States Embassy in N'Djamena

1945 births
2020 deaths
Ambassadors of the United States to Chad
Bowdoin College alumni
Writers from New Haven, Connecticut
Writers from Portland, Maine
United States Foreign Service personnel
Deaths from cancer in Maine
Deaths from pancreatic cancer